Sonia Gandhi  (née Maino; born 9 December 1946) is an Indian politician. She is the longest serving president of the Indian National Congress, a social democratic political party, which has governed India for most of its post-independence history. She took over as the party leader in 1998, seven years after the assassination of Rajiv Gandhi, her husband and a former Prime Minister of India, and remained in office until 2017 after serving for twenty-two years. She returned to the post in 2019 and remained the President for another three years.

Born in a small village near Vicenza, Italy, Gandhi was raised in a Roman Catholic family. After completing her primary education at local schools, she moved for language classes to Cambridge, England, where she met Rajiv Gandhi, and later married him in 1968. She then moved to India and started living with her mother-in-law, the then-Prime Minister of India, Indira Gandhi, at the latter's New Delhi residence. Sonia Gandhi, however, kept away from the public sphere, even during the years of her husband's premiership.

Following her husband's assassination, Gandhi was invited by Congress leaders to lead the party, but she declined. She agreed to join politics in 1997 after much pleading from the party; the following year, she was nominated for party president, and elected over Jitendra Prasada. Under her leadership, the Congress went on to form the government post the 2004 elections in coalition with other centre-left political parties. Gandhi has since been credited for being instrumental in formulating the United Progressive Alliance (UPA), which was re-elected to power in 2009. Gandhi declined the premiership following the 2004 victory; she instead led the ruling alliance and the National Advisory Council.

Over the course of her career, Gandhi presided over the advisory councils credited for the formation and subsequent implementation of such rights-based development and welfare schemes as the right to information, Food Security Bill, and MGNREGA, as she drew criticism related to the Bofors scandal and the National Herald case. Her foreign birth has also been a subject of much debate and controversy. Gandhi's active participation in politics began to reduce during the latter half of the UPA government's second term owing to health concerns. She stepped down as the Congress president in December 2017, but returned to lead the party in August 2019. Although she has not held any public office in the government of India, Gandhi has been widely described as one of the most powerful politicians in the country, and is often listed among the most powerful women in the world.

Early life

Sonia Maino was born on 9 December 1946 to Stefano and Paola Maino in Lusiana (in Maini street), a historically Cimbrian-speaking village about 35 km from Vicenza in Veneto, Italy. She was one of three siblings: Sonia, Nadia and Anoushka, raised in a traditional Roman Catholic Christian family. Sonia spent her adolescence in Orbassano, a town near Turin. She attained primary education attending the local Catholic schools; one of her early teachers described her as "a diligent little girl, [who] studied as much as was necessary".

Stefano, who was a building mason, established a small construction business in Orbassano. He had fought against the Soviet military alongside Hitler's Wehrmacht on the eastern front in World War II, was a loyal supporter of Benito Mussolini and Italy's National Fascist Party. The family house had leather bound books on writings and speeches of Mussolini. Stefano had named Sonia and her elder sister Nadia in the memory of the Italian participation in the Eastern Front. He died in 1983. Gandhi has two sisters who still reside in Orbassano along with their mother.

Gandhi completed her schooling at the age of 13; her final report card read: "intelligent, diligent, committed [...] would succeed well at the high school for teachers". She aspired to become a flight attendant. In 1964, she went to study English at the Bell Educational Trust's language school in the city of Cambridge. The following year, she met Rajiv Gandhi at the Varsity Restaurant, where she was working as a part-time waitress, while he was enrolled for an engineering degree in the Trinity College at the University of Cambridge. In this context, the Times, London reported, "Mrs Gandhi was an 18-year-old student at a small language college in Cambridge in 1965, [...] when she met a handsome young engineering student". The couple married in 1968, in a Hindu ceremony, following which she moved into the house of her mother-in-law and then Prime Minister, Indira Gandhi.

The couple had two children, Rahul Gandhi (born 1970) and Priyanka Vadra (born 1972). Despite belonging to the influential Nehru family, Sonia and Rajiv avoided all involvement in politics. Rajiv worked as an airline pilot while Sonia took care of her family.
She spent considerable amount of time with her mother-in-law, Indira Gandhi; she recalled her experience in a 1985 interview with the Hindi-language magazine Dharmyug, "She [Indira] showered me with all her affection and love".  Soon after the latter's ousting from office in 1977 in the aftermath of the Indian Emergency, the Rajiv family contemplated moving abroad for a short time. When Rajiv entered politics in 1982 after the death of his younger brother Sanjay Gandhi in a plane crash on 23 June 1980, Sonia continued to focus on her family and avoided all contact with the public.

Sonia Gandhi's mother, Mrs. Paola Maino, died due to an illness at her home in Italy on Saturday, August 27, 2022, at the age of about 90.

Political career

Rajiv Gandhi's premiership (1984–1990)

Sonia Gandhi's involvement with Indian public life began after the assassination of her mother-in-law and her husband's election as prime minister. As the prime minister's wife she acted as his official hostess and also accompanied him on a number of state visits.

In 1984, she actively campaigned against her husband's sister-in-law Maneka Gandhi who was running against Rajiv in Amethi. At the end of Rajiv Gandhi's five years in office, the Bofors scandal broke out. Ottavio Quattrocchi, an Italian businessman believed to be involved, was said to be a friend of Sonia Gandhi, having access to the Prime Minister's official residence. The BJP has alleged that she appeared on the voters' list in New Delhi prior to obtaining Indian citizenship in April 1983, in contravention of Indian law.

Former senior Congress leader and former President of India Pranab Mukherjee said that she surrendered her Italian passport to the Italian Embassy on 27 April 1983. Italian nationality law did not permit dual nationality until 1992. So, by acquiring Indian citizenship in 1983, she would automatically have lost Italian citizenship.

Active politics and Congress President (1991–1998)

After Rajiv Gandhi was assassinated in 1991 and Sonia Gandhi refused to succeed him as the Congress president and prime minister, the party settled on the choice of P. V. Narasimha Rao who subsequently became Prime Minister after winning elections that year. Over the next few years, however, the Congress fortunes continued to dwindle and it lost the 1996 elections. Several senior leaders such as Madhavrao Sindhia, Rajesh Pilot, Narayan Dutt Tiwari, Arjun Singh, Mamata Banerjee, G. K. Moopanar, P. Chidambaram and Jayanthi Natarajan were in open revolt against incumbent President Sitaram Kesri and many of whom quit the party, splitting the Congress into many factions.

In an effort to revive the party's sagging fortunes, she joined the Congress Party as a primary member in the Calcutta Plenary Session in 1997 and became party leader in 1998.

In May 1999, three senior leaders of the party (Sharad Pawar, P. A. Sangma, and Tariq Anwar) challenged her right to try to become India's Prime Minister because of her foreign origins. In response, she offered to resign as party leader, resulting in an outpouring of support and the expulsion from the party of the three rebels who went on to form the Nationalist Congress Party.

Within 62 days of joining as a primary member, she was offered the party President post which she accepted.

She contested Lok Sabha elections from Bellary, Karnataka and Amethi, Uttar Pradesh in 1999. She won both seats but chose to represent Amethi. In Bellary, she had defeated veteran BJP leader, Sushma Swaraj.

Leader of the Opposition (1999–2003)
She was elected the Leader of the Opposition of the 13th Lok Sabha in 1999.

When the BJP-led NDA formed a government under Atal Bihari Vajpayee, she took the office of the Leader of Opposition. In 2000,She defeated Jitendra Prasada by a huge margin of 97% in Congress President Election. She had been repeatedly selected for the position without any election being held. As Leader of Opposition, she called a no-confidence motion against the NDA government led by Vajpayee in 2003.

Electoral success and NAC chairmanship (2004–2014)
In the 2004 general elections, Gandhi launched a nationwide campaign, crisscrossing the country on the Aam Aadmi (ordinary man) slogan in contrast to the 'India Shining' slogan of the BJP-led National Democratic Alliance (NDA) alliance. She countered the BJP asking "Who is India Shining for?". In the election, she was re-elected by a 200,000-vote margin over nearest rival, in the Rae Bareli. Following the unexpected defeat of the NDA, she was widely expected to be the next Prime Minister of India. On 16 May, she was unanimously chosen to lead a 15-party coalition government with the support of the left, which was subsequently named the United Progressive Alliance (UPA).

The defeated NDA protested once again her 'foreign origin' and senior NDA leader Sushma Swaraj threatened to shave her head and "sleep on the ground", among other things, should Sonia become prime minister.

The NDA claimed that there were legal reasons that barred her from the Prime Minister's post.

They pointed, in particular, to Section 5 of the Indian Citizenship Act of 1955, which they claimed implied 'reciprocity'. This was contested by others and eventually the suits were dismissed by the Supreme Court of India.

A few days after the election, Gandhi recommended Manmohan Singh as her choice as prime minister, that the party leaders accepted. Her supporters compared it to the old Indian tradition of renunciation, while her opponents attacked it as a political stunt.

On 23 March 2006, Gandhi announced her resignation from the Lok Sabha and also as chairperson of the National Advisory Council under the office-of-profit controversy and the speculation that the government was planning to bring an ordinance to exempt the post of chairperson of National Advisory Council from the purview of office of profit. She was re-elected from her constituency Rae Bareli in May 2006 by a margin of over 400,000 votes.

As chairperson of the National Advisory Committee and the UPA, she played an important role in making the National Rural Employment Guarantee Scheme and the Right to Information Act into law.

She addressed the United Nations on 2 October 2007, Mahatma Gandhi's birth anniversary which is observed as the international day of non-violence after a UN resolution passed on 15 July 2007.

Under her leadership, the Congress-led UPA won a decisive majority in the 2009 general elections with Manmohan Singh as the Prime Minister. The Congress itself won 206 Lok Sabha seats, which was then the highest total by any party since 1991. She was re-elected to a third term as a member of parliament representing Rae Bareli.

In 2013, Gandhi became the first person to serve as Congress President for 15 years consecutively. In the same year, Gandhi condemned the Supreme Court judgement supporting Section 377 of the Indian Penal Code and backed LGBT rights.

2014–present
In the 2014 general election, she held her seat in Rae Bareli. However, the Indian National Congress and the Congress-led UPA electoral alliance suffered their worst result in a general election ever, winning only 44 and 59 seats respectively.

When Rahul Gandhi was expected to take over as Congress president, Communist Party of India (Marxist) leader Sitaram Yechury picked Sonia over Rahul, calling her the "glue that binds the opposition" during an interview November 2017 . Rahul took over as the 49th Congress president on 16 December 2017.

Gandhi returned to active politics for Indian National Congress' campaign for the 2018 Karnataka Legislative Assembly election. Having stayed away from campaigning for elections since 2016, Gandhi addressed a rally at Bijapur, which comprised five legislative assembly constituencies; while Congress emerged as the second largest party in the election with 78 seats behind the BJP, the former won four or the five assembly seats from Bijapur. Gandhi also played an active role in orchestrating a post-poll alliance with the Janata Dal (Secular).

Rahul Gandhi, taking responsibility of Congress party's second consecutive loss in general elections held in 2019, resigned from the post of President on May, 25. Following the resignation, party leaders began deliberations for a suitable candidate to replace him. The Congress Working Committee met on August, 10 to take a final call on the matter and passed a resolution asking Sonia Gandhi to take over as interim president until a consensus candidate could be picked.

Following her appointment, Gandhi undertook restructuring of the Congress' state units and appointed Kumari Selja and Eknath Gaikwad as the presidents of the party's Haryana and Mumbai units. Several other changes were also made in the party's organisational units in states slated for elections including Haryana, Maharashtra, and Jharkhand.

In February 2020, Gandhi held a press conference where she demanded that Home Minister Amit Shah should resign for failing to stop the North East Delhi riots. She asked for the deployment of an adequate number of security forces.               
In 2022, it was reported that Sonia Gandhi supports Ashok Gehlot leading Congress as Congress president in the next Indian general election.But, Gehlot not content on that election and Mallikarjun Kharge elected as a new Congress president.

Personal life
Sonia is the widow of Rajiv Gandhi, elder son of Indira Gandhi. She has two children, Rahul Gandhi and Priyanka Gandhi.

In August 2011, she underwent successful surgery for cervical cancer in the United States at Memorial Sloan–Kettering Cancer Center in New York. She returned to India on 9 September after her treatment. Speaking on 18 July 2012, about her son taking a larger role in the party, she said that it is for Rahul to decide.

Sonia Gandhi was listed as one of the fifty best-dressed over 50s by the Guardian in March 2013.
She follows the style quote "Simple is Stylish" and looks no further than mother-in-law Indira Gandhi's "innate sense of fashion".

This was an almost six-fold increase since her declaration in the last election in 2009; party officials attributed this to a switch from book value to market value for asset valuation.

Electoral performances

Honours and recognition

Gandhi was seen as the most powerful politician of India from 2004 to 2014, and variously listed among the most powerful people and women listings by magazines.

In 2013, Sonia Gandhi was ranked 21st among world's most powerful and 9th most powerful woman by Forbes Magazine.

In 2007, she had been named the third most powerful woman in the world by the same magazine and was ranked 6th in exclusive list in 2007.

In 2010, Gandhi ranked as the ninth most powerful person on the planet by Forbes magazine. She was ranked 12 in 2012 in Forbes' powerful people list.

Sonia was also named among the Time 100 most influential people in the world for 2007 and 2008. New Statesman listed Sonia Gandhi at number 29 in their annual survey of "The World's 50 Most Influential Figures" in 2010.

Books featuring Sonia Gandhi

 Sonia Gandhi – An Extraordinary Life, An Indian Destiny (2011), a biography written by Rani Singh.
 Sonia Gandhi: Tryst with India by Nurul Islam Sarkar.
 The Red Sari: A Dramatized Biography of Sonia Gandhi (El Sari Rojo) by Javier Moro
 Sonia: A Biography by Rasheed Kidwai
 The Accidental Prime Minister by Sanjaya Baru, 2014

See also
 List of political families
 List of Italians

References

Notes

Citations

Further reading
 
 S. R. et al. Vakshi (1998) Sonia Gandhi, The President of AICC South Asia Books. 
 Rupa Chaterjee (1999) Sonia Gandhi: The Lady in Shadow Butala. 
 C. Rupa, Rupa Chaterjee (2000) Sonia Mystique South Asia Books. 
 Moro, Javier "El sari rojo" (Ed. Seix Barral, 2008) "Il sari rosso" (Il Saggiatore, 2009)

External links
 
 Profile at Lok Sabha, Parliament of India 
 Official page on Indian National Congress website

|-

|-

|-

|-

|-

|-

India MPs 1999–2004
India MPs 2004–2009
India MPs 2009–2014
India MPs 2014–2019
India MPs 2019–present
Living people
1946 births
People from the Province of Vicenza
20th-century Indian politicians
21st-century Indian politicians
20th-century Indian women politicians
21st-century Indian women politicians
Indian National Congress politicians
Italian emigrants to India
Naturalised citizens of India
Indian people of Italian descent
Leaders of the Opposition (India)
Indian National Congress politicians from Uttar Pradesh
Lok Sabha members from Uttar Pradesh
Members of National Advisory Council, India
Nehru–Gandhi family
Presidents of the Indian National Congress
Spouses of prime ministers of India
Women in Uttar Pradesh politics
Women members of the Lok Sabha
Women opposition leaders
People charged with corruption